Petrovice is a municipality and village in Bruntál District in the Moravian-Silesian Region of the Czech Republic. It has about 100 inhabitants. The village is well preserved and is protected by law as a village monument zone.

Etymology
The name is derived from the personal name Petr. He was probably the leader of the colonizers who came here in the 13th century.

Geography
The municipality is located on the border with Poland in the Osoblažsko microregion.

Petrovice lies in the Zlatohorská Highlands. The highest points in the territory are the slopes of Biskupská hora (at an altitude of about ) in the northern part, and the peaks of Kutný vrch and Solná hora on the southern municipal border. The built-up area is located in the valley of the Osoblaha River, which springs in the territory of Petrovice.

History
The first written mention of Petrovice is from 1267. The village was founded by bishop Bruno von Schauenburg, probably between 1250 and 1252.

Sights
The landmark of Petrovice is the Church of Saint Roch. It is a typical rural single nave church, which was built in the Neoclassical style in 1826–1830.

Notable people
Josef Pfitzner (1901–1945), German politician and writer, executed for war crimes

References

External links

Villages in Bruntál District